Abu’l-Qāsim Ismāʿīl ibn-i ʿAbbād ibn-i ʿAbbās (born 938 - died 30 March 995), better known as Ṣāḥib ibn-i ʿAbbād, also known as Ṣāḥib, was a Persian scholar and statesman, who served as the grand vizier of the Buyid rulers of Ray from 976 to 995.

A native of the suburbs of Isfahan, he was greatly interested in Islamic culture, and wrote on dogmatic theology, history, grammar, lexicography, scholarly criticism and wrote poetry and belles-lettres.

Biography

Family and early life

Sahib was born on 14 September 938 in Talaqancha, a village roughly 20 miles south of the major Buyid city of Isfahan. His father was Abu'l-Hasan Abbad ibn Abbas (d. 946), a renowned and well-educated administrator, who composed works on the Mu'tazili doctrine. Sahib spent his childhood at Talakan, a town in Daylam near Qazvin. He later settled in Isfahan, and served for some time as an official of the Buyid ruler of Jibal, Rukn al-Dawla (r. 935–976). After the death of his father, Sahib became the pupil of the scholar and philosopher, Ibn 'al-Amid, who had recently replaced Sahib's deceased father as the vizier of Rukn al-Dawla.

References

Sources
 

 
 
 
 Pomerantz, M.A. (2021). Adab and governance in two letters of al-Ṣāḥib b. ʿAbbād. History Compass, e12684. https://doi.org/10.1111/hic3.12684 

995 deaths
938 births
10th-century Iranian writers
Buyid viziers
Mu'tazilites
Writers from Isfahan
10th-century Muslim scholars of Islam